Cecilia Alemani (born:1977) is an Italian curator based in New York City. She is the Donald R. Mullen, Jr. Director & Chief Curator of High Line Art and the Artistic Director of the 59th Venice Biennale in 2022. She previously curated the 2017 Biennale's Italian pavilion and served as Artistic Director of the inaugural edition of the 2018 Art Basel Cities in Buenos Aires, held in 2018.

Life and Work 
Born in Italy, Alemani received her BA in Philosophy from the Università degli Studi in Milan and her MA in Curatorial Studies from Bard College, Annandale-on-Hudson, New York.

From 2012 to 2017, she curated Frieze Projects, the nonprofit platform of the Frieze Art Fair, which has presented new productions by emerging artists and reconstructions of historical exhibitions. From 2009 to 2010, she was Curatorial Director of the year-long X Initiative, New York, an experimental nonprofit for which she oversaw numerous exhibitions and events. Alemani is a co-founder of No Soul For Sale, a festival of independent spaces, nonprofit organizations, and artists’ collectives. As an independent curator, she organized many exhibitions in museums, nonprofit spaces, and galleries, including Gió Marconi Gallery, Milan; Blum and Poe, Los Angeles; MoMA/PS1, New York; and the Whitney Museum, New York.

In 2017, Alemani curated the Italian Pavilion at the Venice Biennale, 57th International Art Exhibition. Titled Il Mondo Magico (The Magical World), the exhibition featured new large-scale, site-specific commissions by Giorgio Andreotta Calò, Roberto Cuoghi, and Adelita Husni-Bey. Harnessing the transformative power of the imagination, each artist referenced magic and fable to build fantastical worlds that left visitors with a richer, deeper appreciation of their own.

In 2018, Alemani was Artistic Director of the first edition of Art Basel Cities, a new initiative in partnership with Buenos Aires to celebrate the city’s thriving cultural ecosystem. Alemani curated a city-wide exhibition titled Hopscotch (Rayuela) that featured 18 works in close dialogue with their venues, shaping a multilayered experience that connected visual art, urban spaces, and the city’s histories in unexpected ways. Among the participating artists were Eduardo Basualdo, Pia Camil, Maurizio Cattelan, Gabriel Chaile, and Luciana Lamothe.

For Art Basel 2019, Alemani commissioned Alexandra Pirici to stage a new iteration of Aggregate for the city’s Messeplatz. The immersive work is a performative environment featuring more than 60 performers who move around the visitors, enacting gestures and sounds that reference disparate forms of cultural heritage, creating something like a time capsule.

Since 2011, she has overseen the High Line Art Program, developing an expertise in commissioning and producing ambitious artworks for public and unusual spaces. During her tenure at the High Line, she has commissioned major projects by El Anatsui, Carol Bove, Rashid Johnson, Barbara Kruger, Faith Ringgold, Ed Ruscha, and Adrián Villar Rojas, among other artists. She has also organized group exhibitions featuring works by young and emerging artists, including Firelei Báez, Jon Rafman, Max Hooper Schneider, and Andra Ursuta. Recently, Alemani spearheaded the High Line Plinth, a new program featuring monumental artworks that commenced in June 2019 with Brick House, a sculpture by artist Simone Leigh. Through these public initiatives, Alemani has sought meaningful civic engagement by galvanizing dialogue, awareness, and a sense of possibility.

In response to her appointment as the Curator and Artistic Director of the 59th Venice Biennale in 2022, Alemani commented that “as the first Italian woman to hold this position, I understand and appreciate the responsibility and also the opportunity offered to me,” adding, “I intend to give voice to artists to create unique projects that reflect their visions and our society."

Personal life 
Alemani is married Massimiliano Gioni, an Italian curator and contemporary art critic. The couple has one son together and reside in the East Village, Manhattan in New York City.

Writing 
Alemani has written extensively for various publications, including Artforum.com and Mousse Magazine, and has a weekly column in D, Repubblica as of October 2019. She has authored, co-authored, edited or contributed entries to a number of books.

Selected Books and Contributions 

 Alemani, Cecilia, ed. Il mondo magico: Padiglione Italia, Biennale Arte 2017. Venice: Marsilio, 2017. 
 Alemani, Cecilia, ed. High Art: Public Art on the High Line. New York: NY, Skira Rizzoli, 2015. 
 Alemani, Cecilia. “The Solar Anus.” In Jakub Ziółkowski: 2000 words. Athens, DESTE Foundation, 2014. 
 Alemani, Cecilia, ed. The X Initiative Yearbook. Milan: Mousse Publishing, 2010. 
 Alemani, Cecilia, Maurizio Cattelan, and Massimiliano Gioni. Charley Independents. Athens: Deste Foundation, 2010. 
 Alemani, Cecilia and Massimiliano Gioni, ed. I’m Not There. Gwangju: Gwangju Biennale Foundation, 2010. 
 Alemani, Cecilia, Andrea Bellini, and Lillian Davies, ed. Collecting Contemporary Art. Zürich: JRP Ringier, 2008. 
 Alemani, Cecilia. Arte Contemporanea 7: Ambiente. Milan: Mondadori Electa, 2008.
 Alemani, Cecilia. William Kentridge. Milan: Mondadori Electa, 2006.

References

Further reading

External links 

Living people
1977 births
Italian art curators
Writers from Milan
Venice Biennale artistic directors
Curators from Milan
Italian art critics
Italian women curators